Max Thunder is a joint U.S.–South Korean military exercise that began in 2009. In 2017, it began on 21 April 2017. North Korea responded with the largest ever live fire exercise on 26 April 2017 in Wonsan.

In May 2018, North Korea temporarily canceled high-level talks with the South because of Max Thunder.

See also

Ulchi-Focus Lens: joint military exercise between South Korea and the United States (1998-2008)
 Ulchi-Freedom Guardian: joint exercise between South Korea and the United States (2009-2017)
 Foal Eagle: joint military exercise between South Korea and the United States (1997-2014)

References

Military exercises involving the United States
Foreign relations of North Korea
North Korea–United States relations
Military of South Korea
United States military in South Korea
2009 establishments in South Korea
Recurring events established in 2009